Uncial 058 (in the Gregory-Aland numbering), ε 010 (von Soden), is a Greek uncial manuscript of the New Testament, dated palaeographically to the 4th century.

Description 

The codex contains a part of the Gospel of Matthew (18:18-19.22-23.25-26.28-29), on 1 parchment leaf (19 cm by 13 cm). The text is written in two columns per page, 26 lines per page.

 18:18
 ΕΠ[ι της γης ε]
 ΣΤΑΙΔ[εδεμε]
 ΝΑΕΝΤ[ω ουρα]
 ΝΩ ΚΑΙ ΟΣΛ [..]
 ΛΥΣΑΤΕΠΙΤΗΣ
 [γ]ΕΣΕΣΤΑΙΛΕΛΥ
 [μ]εναεντωου
 [ρ]ΑΝΩ
 18:22
 ΚΙΣΑ[λ]Λ[α εως εβδο]
 [α]ΜΙΝΑΜΗΝΑΕ
 ΜΗΚ[ο]ΝΤΛ[κις ε]
 [γ]ΩΥΜΙΝΟΤΙ
 ΠΤΛ
 ΔΙΑΤ[ου]
 ΕΑΝΔΥΟΕΞΥΜΩ
 ΤΟΟΜΟΙΩΟ[η]ΗΒ[α]
 18:19 ΣΥΜΦΩΝΗΣΩ

 18:28
 [οφειλε]ΝΑΥ
 [τω εκατον δ]ΗΝΑΠΙΑ
 [και κρ[ΑΤΗΣΑΣ
 [α]υτονεπνι
 ΓΕΝΑΕΓΩΝΑ
 ΠΟΔΟΣΕΠΕ[ων]
 18:25
 [αποδοθη]ΝΑΙ                       ΦΕΙΛΕΙΣΠΕΣ[ων]
 18:26 [πεσων]ΟΥΝΟΔΥ         ΟΥΝΟΣΥΝΔΟ[υ]
 [λος]ΠΡΟΣΕΚΥΝΕΙ               18:29 ΛΟΣΑΥΤΟΥΠΑ
 α]ΥΤΩΛΕΓΩΝΚΕ                   ΡΕΚΑΛΕΙ ΑΥΤ[ον]
 ΜΑΚΡΟΘΥΜΗΣΟ                 ΛΕΓΩΝΜΑΚΡ[ο]
 [ε]ΠΕΜΕΚΑΙΠΑΝ                   ΘΥΜΕΣΟΝΕΠΕ

The Greek text of this codex Kurt Aland, with some hesitation, placed in Category III. 

The manuscript was examined by Karl Wessely (1900), Joseph Karabacek, and C. R. Gregory (1887). Gregory gave for it siglum 058.

Currently the manuscript is dated by the INTF to the 4th century.

The codex is located at the Austrian National Library (Pap. G. 39782), in Vienna.

See also 

 List of New Testament uncials
 Textual criticism

References

Further reading 

 

Greek New Testament uncials
4th-century biblical manuscripts
Biblical manuscripts of the Austrian National Library